Babylon Mystery Religion is a book first published in 1966 and reprinted in 1981 by the Ralph Woodrow Evangelistic Association.  In the book Woodrow draws parallels between ancient Babylonian rituals and those found in the Roman Catholic Church. It is based on Alexander Hislop's book The Two Babylons.  

Babylon Mystery Religion is now out of print and a second book is available entitled The Babylon Connection? in which Woodrow recants and refutes his views previously presented in Babylon Mystery Religion.  An online statement from the author can be found at the website.

References

External links 

 Ralph Woodrow Evangelistic Association
 Ralph Woodrow explains why Babylon Mystery Religion has been superseded by The Babylon Connection? 
 Ralph Woodrow recants his original claim that Catholicism had its origins in Paganism

Christian literature
Fringe theories
Pseudohistory
1966 non-fiction books
Anti-Catholic publications